Mortí is a town in the Kuna de Wargandí province of Panama.

Sources 
World Gazetteer: Panama – World-Gazetteer.com

Populated places in Kuna de Wargandí